Days of Remembrance is a book containing authorized English translations of writings of Baháʼu'lláh, founder of the Baháʼí Faith related to nine Baháʼí Holy Days, namely Naw-Rúz, Ridván, Declaration of the Báb, Ascension of Baháʼu'lláh, Martyrdom of the Báb, Birth of the Báb and of Baháʼu'lláh. The book was first published by the Baháʼí World Centre in January 2017.

Included are 45 prayers and tablets, occasionally with repeating refrains, among which are the below titled texts.


Ridván
Almost half of the volume (96 pages) is taken up by 20 Tablets related to Ridván, including:
 Húr-i-ʻUjáb (Tablet of the Wondrous Maiden; 1856–63)  
 Lawh-i-ʻÁshiq va Maʻshúq (Tablet of the Lover and the Beloved)
 Súriy-i-Qalam (Súrih of the Pen; c. 1865)

Declaration of the Báb

 Lawh-i-Náqús (Tablet of the Bell; 1863) 
 Lawh-i-Ghulámu'l-Khuld (Tablet of the Immortal Youth; 1856–63)

Ascension of Baháʼu'lláh

 Súriy-i-Ghusn (Tablet of the Branch; 1863–68) 
 Lawh-i-Rasúl (Tablet to Rasúl)
 Lawh-i-Maryam (Tablet to Maryam)
 Kitáb-i-'Ahd (Book of the Covenant; 1879–91)
 The Tablet of Visitation

Birth of Baháʼu'lláh

Lawh-i-Mawlúd (Tablet of the Birth)

Martyrdom of the Báb

From the following tablets excerpts are included:
 Súriy-i-Nush (Súrih of Counsel; 1857–63)
 Súriy-i-Mulúk (Súrih of the Kings; 1867–68)
 Lawh-i-Salmán I (Tablet to Salmán I; 1864)
 Súriy-i-Dhikr (Súrih of Remembrance)
 Súriy-i-Ahzán (Súrih of Sorrows; 1867–68)

See also
 List of writings of Baháʼu'lláh
 Prayer in the Baháʼí Faith

Bibliography

References

External links
 Epub and Mobi versions for e-readers

Works by Baháʼu'lláh